Adventist Health Glendale is a hospital located in Glendale, California, it is part of the healthcare network Adventist Health. Adventist Health Glendale is one of the city's oldest businesses, founded in 1905, a year before Glendale was incorporated as a city. It was then known as Glendale Sanitarium, and it occupied the former Glendale Hotel, a 75-room Victorian structure on what is now Broadway Avenue.

In 2009, Adventist Health Glendale started HEALTHline, a weekly television show helping people to understand their health and health options. HEALTHline can also be viewed online.

History
At the end of July 2017 Glendale Adventist Medical Center changed its name to Adventist Health Glendale.

Murders
Dr. Peter Martin Keller husband of Nettie Florence Keller was shot to death by a patient at Glendale Sanitarium on October 1, 1931.

Efren Saldivar, a respiratory therapist at Adventist Health Glendale until 1998, came to be dubbed the "Angel of Death" when he confessed to 50 murders of patients through the injection of muscle-paralyzing drugs, though he later retracted the confession. In 2002, he was charged with six murders and pleaded guilty, and was sentenced to prison for life. Many more patients are believed to have been murdered.

Glendale Adventist Academy 
In 1907, the Glendale Sanitarium, as it was called, had a one-room school in its basement. In the 1930s, that school relocated to a building in Chevy Chase and called itself Glendale Union Academy. Eventually, GUA relocated to its current location on Kimlin Drive and Academy Place and renamed itself Glendale Adventist Academy.

Events
Adventist Health Glendale is involved in many annual events such as Glendale Downtown Dash held on daylight savings day every March, the American Cancer Societys Relay for Life and American Heart Associations Saving Strokes.

Medical mission work
Starting in 2015 Adventist Health Glendale has had a partnership with Armenia Fund to provide medical services to Noyemberyan hospital, in Noyemberyan, Armenia. For each medical mission trip Adventist Health Glendale buys large amounts of medical equipment, surgical supplies, pharmaceuticals, and other required medical/surgical items. And Armenia Fund ships the medical supplies to Noyemberyan hospital. 5,750 patients have been given care in internal medicine, cardiology, pulmonology, gynecology, neurology, orthopedics, and pediatrics. 235 surgeries were done, from gallbladder, hernia, orthopedic, and maxillofacial procedures to remove lumps and tumors.

Services
The services of Adventist Health Glendale are: Behavioral medicine, cardiology, diabetes, diagnostic imaging, drug rehabilitation, emergency department, Home health, hospice, laboratory, neonatal care, neuroscience, occupational therapy, oncology, pain management, pediatrics, physical therapy, radiology, sleep medicine, surgery, urgent care, wound care, and Women's health

Awards
Adventist Health Glendale has won many awards from HealthGrades.

See also

References

External links
 

Hospitals in Los Angeles County, California
Hospitals in the San Fernando Valley
Buildings and structures in Glendale, California
Healthcare in Los Angeles
Adventist Health
1905 establishments in California